Üchtelhausen is a municipality and community in the district of Schweinfurt in Bavaria, Germany.

Geography 
Üchtelhausen is located in region Main - Rhön Mountains.
 
It exists following districts: Ebertshausen, Hesselbach, Hoppachshof, Madenhausen, Ottenhausen, Thomashof, Weipoltshausen, Zell, Üchtelhausen.

Demography

References 

Schweinfurt (district)